Clasina (Ina) Isings (15 February 1919 - 3 September 2018) was a Dutch archaeologist and classical scholar specialising in Roman glass.

In 2009 the city of Utrecht awarded her a silver medal in recognition of the work she had done to help preserve the city's history.

Select publications
Isings, C. 1957. Roman glass from dated finds (Archaeologica traiectina, 2). Groningen.
Isings, C. 1964. Some late Roman glass fragments from Rome. New York, Gordon and Breach. 
Isings, C. 1971. Roman Glass in Limburg. Groningen, Wolters-Noordhoff Publishing.
Isings, C. 1972. Voorromeins en romeins glas in het Gemeentelijk Oudheidkundig Museum te Heerlen. Heerlen, Gemeentelijk Oudheidkundig Museum.
Zandstra, M., Polak, M., and Isings, C. et al. 2012. De Romeinse versterkingen in Vechten-Fectio: het archeologisch onderzoek in 1946-1947. Nijmegen, Auxilia.

References

2018 deaths
1919 births
Dutch women archaeologists
20th-century Dutch archaeologists
Women classical scholars